Rajan Saxena is an Indian management expert, academic & writer. He is a former Vice-Chancellor of the SVKM's NMIMS, a deemed university in Mumbai, a former Director of Indian Institute of Management, Indore, S. P. Jain Institute of Management and Research and ICFAI Business School, Gurgaon. He is also a recipient of the BERG Education Award for 2014.

Biography 
Saxena did his college studies at Shri Ram College of Commerce of the Delhi University and secured a doctoral degree (PhD) from the Delhi School of Economics to start his career as a member of faculty at XLRI - Xavier School of Management. Later, he served as the director of S. P. Jain Institute of Management and Research and ICFAI Business School, Gurgaon. When the Indian Institute of Management, Indore was established in 1996, Saxena was appointed as its founder director. In July 2003, he resigned from the post, allegedly due to the appointment of an enquiry committee into the fiscal management of the institution by the Board of Governors. Five years later, he was appointed as the Vice Chancellor of SVKM's NMIMS, Mumbai, having been appointed for a second term in 2014, and retired in 2020.

Saxena, who has been credited with the establishment of NMIMS business schools in Bengaluru and Hyderabad, is a former faculty member of University of Calgary and has taught at University of Stirling as a British Council visitor and at Pace University as a visiting professor. He is a former chairman of the National Academy for Training and Development (NATAD) and has been the government nominee of Mahanagar Telephone Nigam Limited (MTNL). He has served as the senior vice president of the Education Promotion Society of India, Board of Directors of the Lodha Developers Limited, Mumbai and Anuvi Chemicals Limited and the president of the Indian Society for Training & Development. He has also worked as a management consultant to several Indian firms including Reliance Energy, Larsen and Toubro, Parle Exports, Jindal Steel, among others. Besides publishing 60 articles in national and international journals, he has authored Marketing Management, which is a prescribed text on the subject in many Indian universities. He has also delivered keynote addresses and presentations, including at the t EFMD‐CEIBS Conference in Shanghai, 2010.

Awards and honours 
Saxena is an elected Fellow and life member of the Indian Society for Training & Development (ISTD) and a Fellow of the Institute of Management Consultants of India (IMCI). He is a recipient of many honours such as Dr. Suresh Ghai Memorial Award (2013), DNA Hall of Fame Award and ET Now Visionary Leadership Award (2013). and he received the BERG Education Award in 2014.

See also 

 Shri Ram College of Commerce
 XLRI - Xavier School of Management
 S. P. Jain Institute of Management and Research
 Indian Institute of Management, Indore

References

External links 
 
 
 

Living people
Shri Ram College of Commerce alumni
Delhi University alumni
Indian Institute of Management Indore
Academic staff of the University of Calgary
Academics of the University of Stirling
Pace University faculty
Indian management consultants
Year of birth missing (living people)
Heads of universities and colleges in India